Ernest Robert Walker (September 17, 1890 – April 1, 1965), was a Major League Baseball outfielder who played from  to  with the St. Louis Browns. He batted left and threw right-handed. Walker had a .256 batting average, with 65 career hits.

He was born in Blossburg, Alabama, and died in Pell City, Alabama. His interment was located in Birmingham's Fraternal Cemetery.

Walker was the brother of Major Leaguer Dixie Walker, and the uncle of Major Leaguers Dixie Walker and Harry Walker.

External links

1890 births
1965 deaths
Major League Baseball pitchers
Baseball players from Alabama
St. Louis Browns players
Montgomery Rebels players
Little Rock Travelers players
Mobile Bears players
Sioux City Indians players
St. Joseph Saints players
Charleston Pals players
Macon Peaches players